Oscar Jefferson Upham (December 14, 1871 – February 18, 1949) was a private serving in the United States Marine Corps during the Boxer Rebellion who received the Medal of Honor for bravery.

In addition to his service during the Boxer rebellion, he also served in the Spanish–American War and is credited as shooting the first shot from the USS Oregon which started the Spanish–American War.

Biography
Upham was born December 14, 1871, in Toledo, Ohio, enlisted into the Marine Corps in 1896 at the age of 25. He was stationed at Mare Island, California. While Upham was on duty, the Spanish fleet exited the harbor at Santiago, Cuba, on July 3, 1898. Upham was serving as a powder monkey for one of the six-inch guns on the Oregon's bridge; he was given the order to shoot, and Upham is credited as shooting the first shot which began the Spanish–American War.

During the Boxer Rebellion in 1900, he and his fellow Marines were erecting barricades in Peking, China, when the Chinese rebels surrounded the group and settled down for a three-month siege. A quotation from his diary, kept during the siege, reads: "We are holding out no hope for rescue and many do not give rescue a second thought." He was earned the Medal of Honor for this action — one of 33 Marines to earn the  award during the rebellion. He received the Medal of Honor for his action in Peking, China from on July 21 – August 17, 1900.

During his enlistment, Upham kept a detailed diary of events. Portions of that diary have been published multiple times.   Upham's parents were in the Oklahoma Land Run of 1889 and after his service he joined them there and made Oklahoma his home. He retired from the US Postal Service, and he died February 14, 1949, in Guthrie, Oklahoma, where many of his family still live today. . He is buried in Summit View Cemetery Guthrie, Oklahoma.

Medal of Honor citation
Rank and organization: Private, U.S. Marine Corps. Born: 14 January 1871, Toledo, Ohio. Accredited to: Illinois. G.O. No.: 55, 19 July 1901.

Citation:
In the presence of the enemy at Peking, China, 21 July to 17 August 1900. Although under a heavy fire from the enemy during this period, Upham assisted in the erection of barricades.

See also

List of Medal of Honor recipients
List of Medal of Honor recipients for the Boxer Rebellion

References

External links

1871 births
1949 deaths
United States Marine Corps Medal of Honor recipients
United States Marines
American military personnel of the Boxer Rebellion
American military personnel of the Spanish–American War
People from Toledo, Ohio
Boxer Rebellion recipients of the Medal of Honor